The 2017–18 United Arab Emirates Tri-Nation Series was a cricket tournament that took place in January 2018 in the United Arab Emirates. It was a tri-nation series between Ireland, Scotland and the United Arab Emirates, with all the matches played as One Day Internationals (ODIs). The matches were in preparation for the 2018 Cricket World Cup Qualifier, which was held in Zimbabwe in March 2018. Ireland won the series after winning all four of their matches, finishing with a 24-run victory against Scotland. Scotland and the United Arab Emirates won one match each, both finishing with two points, with Scotland finishing in second place on net run rate.

Squads

Richie Berrington replaced Kyle Coetzer as Scotland's captain for their first two matches, as Coetzer was completing a coaching qualification.

Results

Standings

Matches

Notes

References

External links
 Series home at ESPN Cricinfo

2018 in Emirati cricket
2018 in Irish cricket
2018 in Scottish cricket
Scottish cricket tours abroad
International cricket competitions in 2017–18
Irish cricket tours of the United Arab Emirates